Termes-d'Armagnac (Gascon: Tèrmis d’Armanhac) is a commune in the Gers department in southwestern France.

Geography

Population

Notable people 
Thibault d'Armagnac (1405-1457), companion of Joan of Arc

See also
Communes of the Gers department
Château de Thibault de Termes

References

Communes of Gers